George Simon Stanford (born May 8) is an American, Los Angeles-based singer and songwriter, who was signed to Mercury Records.  He is a former member and lead vocalist for the band Townhall.

Education 
Stanford is a graduate of Harriton High School in Rosemont, Pennsylvania, where he played trombone in his high school jazz band.

Career
Stanford attended University of the Arts (Philadelphia) to study music, but dropped out to play with the Philladelphia rock act, Townhall, a relationship that lasted five years (and produced one live album - 2001's Live at the Point - and two studio albums - 2003's New Song and 2005's American Dreams). In 2006, Stanford moved to Los Angeles and was offered a record deal with Epic Records. He relocated to Smash/Mercury Records the following year, moved back to his native Philadelphia, and released his debut album, Big Drop, in June 2008. It was preceded by an EP and the lead single "My Own Worst Enemy" which was featured on VH1's "You Oughta Know" program.

After his departure from the label, he formed his own independent label, gbones Music, and released the EP Roll Away in 2010, with his biggest single to date, "Meet Me in L.A.". He followed it up with the Las Palmas EP in 2012 and an artist residency at The Piano Bar in Hollywood.

His second studio album, Something Better was released in 2014, and included the track "Happy As You Are" which was featured on Amazon.com's "Artists on the Rise" series. Later that year, he premiered a holiday track "It's Christmas Time (Midnight Ridin')" for his fans.

In 2015, he worked on the soundtrack to the feature film "The Grace of Jake" starring Jordin Sparks and Michael Beck. He released his new single "Pressure Makes Diamonds" in October 2015, and premiered it on Pat Monahan's show on SiriusXM's The Pulse. He premiered a new song "I Got Famous" on his official SoundCloud/YouTube accounts in May.

In August 2016, he announced he had scored two original songs for the upcoming J.K. Simmons film "The Bachelors" set for release in 2017. The following month, he announced he had signed with Round Hill Music, as a songwriter. In a September e-blast, he announced a new single release for November titled "Starring You". In 2017, he continued to tour in addition to releasing three more additional digital singles "Better Man" "Future Classic" and "Moving On."

In 2018, his song "Magic Hour" received placements in the television series Kevin (Probably) Saves the World and Chicago P.D.. He released a new digital single "Holding On" on May 23, 2018.

In August, he announced a new EP recorded in an old Los Angeles church titled Alone at the Pilgrim set for release in November. Additionally, he premiered a new digital single titled "Rebellionaire" on October 10.

In November, he began premiering a series of videos from the Alone at the Pilgrim sessions each week produced by TAR+FEATHER, leading up to the release of the EP on December 7.

Personal life
He is married with two children.

Discography

Albums

Solo career

With Townhall

EPs

Singles

Videos
Alone At The Pilgrim (2018)
My Own Worst Enemy (2008)
Meet Me in L.A. (2009)
Roll Away (2010)
Lemonade (2011)
Cardboard Baby (Acoustic) (2012)
Natural Girls (2011)
Things I Don't Need (2012)
Christmas For Two (2012)
Downriver (2013)

References

External links
Stanford, George, Official Site
Dye, David, George Stanford: Pop Meets Soul, World Cafe, National Public Radio, February 29, 2008

American rock musicians
American male singer-songwriters
Living people
American rock singers
American rock guitarists
American soul guitarists
American male guitarists
American bandleaders
Mercury Records artists
Singer-songwriters from Pennsylvania
Guitarists from Philadelphia
Year of birth missing (living people)